Olga Fialka (1848-1930) was an Austria-Hungarian artist and matriarch of the Ferenczy family of artists.

Biography
Olga Fialka was born on 19 April 1848 in Theresienstadt. She studied painting under Jan Matejko in Kraków. She went on to study under August Eisenmenger in Vienna. She created paintings and book illustrations. Around 1884 she married Károly Ferenczy with whom she had three children. Fialka turned her attention away from art and focused on raising her children. The couple's first child  (1885-1954) became a painter and printmaker. In 1890 their twins were born. Béni Ferenczy (1890–1967) became a sculptor and Noémi Ferenczy (1890-1957) became a textile artist.

Fialka died on 17 December 1930 in Baia Mare, Romania.

Gallery

References

1848 births
1930 deaths
19th-century women artists
20th-century Czech women artists